Presidential elections were held in Iceland on 30 June 1968. The result was a victory for Kristján Eldjárn, who received 65.6% of the vote.

Results

References

Iceland
Presidential election
Presidential elections in Iceland
Iceland